Thaalam Manasinte Thaalam is a 1981 Indian Malayalam-language film,  directed by A. T. Abu. The film stars Prem Nazir, Sheela, Jagathy Sreekumar and Thikkurissy Sukumaran Nair. The film has musical score by G. Devarajan.

Cast
Prem Nazir
Sheela
Jagathy Sreekumar
Thikkurissy Sukumaran Nair
Baby Ponnambili
 P. A. Aziz
Jalaja
Santhakumari
Sreenath

Soundtrack
The music was composed by G. Devarajan and the lyrics were written by Devadas.

References

External links
 

1981 films
1980s Malayalam-language films
Films directed by A. T. Abu